Lapuente is a village, or populated centre, in the Rivera Department of northeastern Uruguay.

Geography

Population
In 2011 Lapuente had a population of 321.
 
Source: Instituto Nacional de Estadística de Uruguay

References

External links
INE map of Lapuente

Populated places in the Rivera Department

de:Lapuente